The Eyes of the Mask is a 1920 German silent film directed by Karl Gerhardt and starring Lil Dagover.

Cast
 Lil Dagover
 Ally Kay

References

Bibliography

External links

1920 films
Films of the Weimar Republic
Films directed by Karl Gerhardt
German silent feature films
Films produced by Erich Pommer
German black-and-white films